Remich is a commune with town status in south-eastern Luxembourg with a population of 3,645 inhabitants . It is the capital of the canton of Remich. Remich lies on the left bank of the river Moselle, which forms part of the border between Luxembourg and Germany. The commune is the smallest in Luxembourg by surface area.

The Moselle valley is dominated by wine-making and many small wine-making towns, of which Remich is one of the most picturesque and frequented by tourists.

History
In the 5th century, after the withdrawal of Roman troops, the Roman settlement of "Remacum" gradually turned into "Remich".

In the 8th century the King of the Franks, Pepin the Short ceded his crown estate "Hof Remich" to the Benedictine St. Maximin's Abbey in Trier and to Prüm Abbey. In 882, the Normans destroyed the settlement. Fragments of the medieval town fortifications from 952, such as the St. Nicolas gate, are still visible today. Originally the town gate, it is dedicated to the patron saint of fishermen and sailors, and is registered as a national monument today, as is the decanal church, whose rectangular tower is a former defensive tower from the 12th century. In 1687 the town's fortifications were demolished by the army of Louis XIV.

There are still various coats of arms and guild symbols on some of the houses today.

In 1866 the first bridge was built over the Moselle. After its destruction in World War II it was replaced first with a wooden construction, then in 1958 with the bridge that still stands today. Since its canalisation in 1964, it has been possible for boats to sail on the Moselle all year round.

Population

Remich Fuesend Karneval
Remich annually holds a three-day-long celebration for Carnival (called Fuesend Karneval in Luxembourgish). Remich is notable for two special events in addition to its Fuesend Karneval parades. The first of these is the Stréimännchen, which is the burning of a male effigy from the Remich bridge that crosses the Moselle separating the Grand Duchy from Germany. The Stréimännchen symbolizes the burning away of winter. The other special event at the Remich Fuesend celebrations is the Buergbrennen or bonfire that closes the celebration.

Communal council

Current composition 
The communal council is composed as detailed below. The results are those of the most recent communal elections on 8 October 2017. 

NB: The "Change" column refers to a party's number of seats gained/lost since the 2011 communal elections.

Past

List of mayors
 Jacques Sitz (2017–)
 Henri Kox (2009–2017)
 Jeannot Belling (1997–2009)
 Fernand Kons (1970–1993)
 Jean-Auguste Neyen (1888–1890)
 Joseph-Chrétien Gretsch (ca. 1870)
 Willibrorde Macher (ca. 1849–1856)

Notable people
Mary Alfred Moes, American Roman Catholic nun, was born in Remich.

Twin towns — sister cities

Remich is twinned with:
 Bessan, France

References

External links

 
Website of the town of Remich

 
Cities in Luxembourg
Communes in Remich (canton)
Towns in Luxembourg
Germany–Luxembourg border crossings